Jo Soo-chul (born 30 October 1990) is a South Korean footballer who plays as centre midfielder for Bucheon FC in K League 2.

Career
Jo joined Seongnam Ilhwa in before the 2013 season starts. But he made no appearances in his first professional team.

He moved to Incheon United in January 2014 and play his first professional match on 10 May against Jeonbuk.

He signed with Pohang Steelers in January 2016 after a contract dispute with Incheon.

References

External links 

1990 births
Living people
Association football midfielders
South Korean footballers
Seongnam FC players
Incheon United FC players
Pohang Steelers players
Bucheon FC 1995 players
Gimcheon Sangmu FC players
K League 1 players
K League 2 players